This is a list of English words that are borrowed directly or ultimately from Dravidian languages. Dravidian languages include Tamil, Malayalam, Kannada, Telugu, and a number of other languages spoken mainly in South Asia. The list is by no means exhaustive.

Some of the words can be traced to specific languages, but others have disputed or uncertain origins. Words of disputed or less certain origin are in the "Dravidian languages" list. Where lexicographers generally agree on a source language, the words are listed by language.

From unknown or disputed Dravidian languages
Aiyo, a word used to express distress, regret and fear, either from Tamil aiyō, Sinhalese ayiyō, or Kannada ayyo or Malayalam aiyyo(അയ്യോ) or Telugu ayyo.
Betel, a leaf of a vine belonging to the family Piperaceae; from Portuguese betel, which probably comes from Tamil vettrilai (வெற்றிலை) or Malayalam vettila (വെറ്റില).
Candy, crystallized sugar or confection made from sugar; via Persian qand, which is probably from a Dravidian language, ultimately stemming from the Sanskrit root word 'Khanda' meaning 'pieces of something'.
 Coir, cord/rope, fibre from husk of coconut; from Malayalam kayar (കയർ) or Tamil kayiru (கயிறு). The origin of this word cannot be conclusively attributed to Malayalam or Tamil.
Congee, porridge, water with rice; uncertain origin, possibly from Tamil kanji (கஞ்சி), Telugu or Kannada gañji, or Malayalam kaṇni (കഞ്ഞി)
Coolie, a labourer or slave, a South Asian person; possibly from Tamil cooli (கூலி) or Malayalam kooli (കൂലി) "labour", or possibly from Koḷī "Gujarati people" in Gujarati, which is not a Dravidian language
Cot, a bedstead or a portable bed; via Hindi from Sanskrit, which in turn may have come from a Dravidian source such as Tamil kattil (கட்டில்)/patukkai (படுக்கை) or Malayalam kattil(കട്ടിൽ) or Kannada Kaata (ಕಾಟ).
Cowry, the shells of certain sea snails, or the snails themselves; via Hindi and Urdu from Sanskrit kaparda (कपर्द), which may be related to Tamil kotu (கோது) "shell".
Curry, a variety of dishes flavored with a spicy sauce; cognates exist in several Dravidian languages, including Tamil (கறி), Malayalam (കറി), Telugu (కూర) and others.
Dosa, a pancake made from rice flour and ground pulses, typically served with a spiced vegetable filling. Possibly from Kannada or Tulu dōse (ದೋಸೆ), from Tamil tōcai, or from other Dravidian sources. 
Ginger, a fragrant spice; exact route from Dravidian is uncertain, but possibly from Tamil inchi (இஞ்சி) or Malayalam inchi (ഇഞ്ചി)
 Godown, synonym to warehouse; English from Malay, which in turn may have borrowed it from Telugu giḍangi or Tamil kiṭanku.
Gunny, an inexpensive bag; from Sanskrit via Hindi and Marathi, probably ultimately from a Dravidian language.
Hot toddy, beverage made of alcoholic liquor with hot water, sugar, and spices; from Hindi tari "palm sap", probably from a Dravidian language
Idli, a south Indian steamed cake of rice, usually served with sambhar. From Malayalam and Kannada iḍḍali.
Jaggery, coarse brown sugar made from palm and sugarcane; via Portuguese jágara probably from Malayalam chakkara/sharkkara (ചക്കര/ശർക്കര) or Kannada sakkare Or Telugu Chakkera,  having its origins in Sanskrit.
Mango, A tropical fruit;origin probably from Tamil maangaay or Malayalam maanga (മാങ്ങ)
Mongoose, a small carnivorous mammal from southern Eurasia or Africa, known for killing snakes; probably ultimately from a Dravidian language, with spelling influenced by the English word goose
Mung, a type of bean; ultimately from Sanskrit mudga (मुद्ग), which is the name of the bean and the plant, perhaps via Tamil mūngu (முங்கு) "soak", or Malayalam mudra (മുദ്ര). Alternately, perhaps from mũg (मूँग), the name of the bean in Hindi, which is not a Dravidian language.
Orange, a citrus fruit, or a color named for the fruit; cognates exist in several Dravidian languages, Tamil naaram (நாரம்) or Telugu naarinja (నారింజ) and others.
Pagoda, a religious building; etymology uncertain but perhaps influenced by Tamil pagavadi (பகாவடி) "house belonging to a deity".
Pariah, a social outcast; from Tamil paṟaiyar (பறையர்) or Malayalam paṟayan(പറയൻ), "drummer".
Peacock, a type of bird; from Old English pawa, the earlier etymology is uncertain, but one possible source is Tamil tokei (தோகை) "peacock feather", via Latin or Greek
Sambal, a spicy condiment; from Malay, which may have borrowed the word from a Dravidian language such as Tamil (சம்பல்) or Telugu (సంబల్).
Teak, a tropical hardwood tree; called thekku (തേക്ക്) in Malayalam, tekku (தேக்கு) in Tamil,  Telugu teku, and Kannada tegu; via Portuguese teca.

Malayalam

Tamil
Gregory James, a professor with the language center of Hong Kong university believes that more than 100 words in the Oxford English Dictionary have Tamil origin, and there could be even more.

Telugu

Kannada

See also
Indian English
List of English words of Indian origin

Notes

References

Lists of English words of Indian origin
Dravidian languages
English